Hrubá Skála is a municipality and village in Semily District in the Liberec Region of the Czech Republic. It has about 600 inhabitants.

Administrative parts
Villages and hamlets of Bohuslav, Borek, Doubravice, Hnanice, Krčkovice, Rokytnice and Želejov are administrative parts of Hrubá Skála.

Geography
It lies in the Bohemian Paradise region within the Jičín Uplands. The adjacent sandstone Hrubá Skála rock town with volcanic sandstone pillars stretches to Trosky Castle. It has been protected as a nature reserve since 1998 and is a popular destination for climbers and hikers.

History

The castle is situated on a steep sandstone cliff on a rock platform and was originally called Skála (The Rock). The first written mention of Hrubá Skála Castle is from 1353, seven years before the first mention of the settlement. It was then a possession of the noble Hynek von Waldstein. The manor was called Hrubá Skála to differ it from nearby Malá Skála. His descendants owned the castle until 1416 when it was taken over by the lords of Jenstein and then, in 1460, by Zajíc of Hasenburg.

Held by the Lords of Smiřice from 1515 onwards, the rebuilt Renaissance castle had become the centre of one of the largest Bohemian estates with more than 50 villages. Seized by Emperor Ferdinand II upon the 1620 Battle of White Mountain, it was again held by the Waldstein dynasty from 1630 and devastated by both Saxon and Imperial troops during the Thirty Years' War. It was rebuilt in 1710 and again in 1804.

In 1821, Franz de Paula Adam von Waldstein sold Hrubá Skála to Johann Anton Lexa von Aehrenthal. In 1859, Skála Castle was again rebuilt in the style of a Renaissance chateau.

After World War II the Aerenthal family was dispossessed in 1945 and the German-speaking population expelled according to the Beneš decrees. Under Communist rule, the castle served as a recreation home. For some years now, the property has been operated as a hotel and spa.

Notable people
Alois Lexa von Aehrenthal (1854–1912), Austro-Hungarian count and politician

References

External links

Villages in Semily District